Huang Hong (born May 25, 1960) is a Chinese skit and sitcom actor and writer. He is also less successful as a TV series and movie producer and director.

Career
Born in Harbin, he joined the People's Liberation Army (PLA) when he was only 13. He studied philosophy at Liaoning University and performance at the People's Liberation Army Academy of Art. Huang was a regular sketch comedy performer on the CCTV New Year's Gala, appearing on the show almost uninterruptedly for over two decades between 1989 and 2012, during which he became a household name in China. Some of his skits including Anti-family plan Guerrilla, Poker. The director and the leading actor of films A Father With His 25 Children (2001) and Sunny Courtyard (2007).

He became the head of the August First Film Studio in 2012. In March 2015 he was removed from the position of unknown reasons, though the media speculated about his involvement in corruption. He has been linked by Chinese-language media to disgraced general Xu Caihou. However, later his return to the stage indicate that all accusations were false.

Personal life
Huang's father Huang Feng is a kuaishu performing artist. Huang has two elder brothers.

In 1986, at the age of 26, Huang got acquainted with Duan Xiaojie, an actress in Shenyang Mass Art Center. They married on October 8, 1989. Their daughter, Huang Zhaohan (nickname: Huang Doudou ), was born in 1994.

References

1960 births
Living people
Liaoning University alumni
People's Liberation Army Academy of Art alumni
Male actors from Heilongjiang
Chinese male voice actors
Chinese male film actors
Chinese male television actors
Members of the 11th Chinese People's Political Consultative Conference